Albert Edward Taylor (14 June 1894 – 19 August 1960) was an English cricketer who made one appearance in first-class cricket in 1927.

Taylor was selected to play what would be his only first-class cricket match when picked for Warwickshire against Somerset in the County Championship at Taunton. In a match which ended in a draw, Taylor bowled 5 overs without taking a wicket in Somerset's only innings, while in Warwickshire's only innings he was dismissed bowled by Jack White for a duck.

He died at Rotherham, Yorkshire on 19 August 1960.

References

External links
Albert Taylor at ESPNcricinfo
Albert Taylor at CricketArchive

`

1894 births
1960 deaths
Sportspeople from Nuneaton
English cricketers
Warwickshire cricketers